Roads of Kiarostami is a 2005 Iranian documentary film directed by Abbas Kiarostami.

See also
List of Iranian films

External links

Films directed by Abbas Kiarostami
2005 films
2000s Persian-language films
Documentary films about visual artists
Iranian documentary films
2005 documentary films